Margareta "Grete" Rosenberg (October 7, 1896 – February 5, 1979) was a German freestyle swimmer, who competed in the 1912 Summer Olympics. She won a silver medal in relay together with her teammates Wally Dressel, Louise Otto and Hermine Stindt. In the 100 metre freestyle competition she finished fourth.

References

1896 births
1979 deaths
German female freestyle swimmers
German female swimmers
Olympic swimmers of Germany
Swimmers at the 1912 Summer Olympics
Olympic silver medalists for Germany
Medalists at the 1912 Summer Olympics
Olympic silver medalists in swimming